Mizerka is a trick-taking card game belonging to the Whist group. Mizerka is a three-person game. Although it originates in Poland, Mizerka's popularity has largely increased in the United States. What distinguishes Mizerka from tradition trick is the use of a fourth dealt pile, serving as a "grab bag" for players to exchange their cards. This pile is referred to as the talon.

Gameplay

Cards 
Mizerka uses a standard 52-card pack of French-suited cards.

Initial deal 
Mizerka is started when a dealer deals four sets of six cards. Each player takes a pile and the remaining pile is left in the center. This pile is referred to as the talon. Once these cards have been dealt, forehand, the player to the left of the dealer, chooses the contract.

Contract 
Forehand is able to choose a contract. A contract dictates a trump suit (or lack thereof) and the method for scoring points. There are six contracts: Spades, Clubs, Hearts, Diamonds, No Trump, and Mizerka. For all contracts named after a suit, the contract designates the trump suit. For the No Trump contract no trump is assigned. The Mizerka contract in addition to having no trump suit, also has a goal of not winning tricks.

Second deal/talon use 
The remaining twenty-eight cards are then dealt once the player chooses a contract. At this point, each player should have thirteen cards. Forehand is then able to swap as many cards as they would like from the talon. If there are still cards remaining, middlehand, the player to the dealer's right, is then able to swap with the talon. This player may only swap as many cards with talon as there are remaining. In the rare case that cards remain in the talon after two players have swapped, the dealer is then able to swap with the talon.

Trick winning 
Trick winning is inherent in many different card games, the most famous of which being Bridge.  With the exception of the Mizerka contract, the objective is to win tricks. A trick is won by playing the highest card among the three cards that are played within a round. The exception to this rule is when the trump suit is played. The trump suit (determined by the contract) ranks higher than any non-trump card. The only way to beat a trump card is with a higher trump card. Forehand leads with a card of his choice. After this player plays a card, middlehand plays a card, following the suit if possible. However, if the player lacks cards of the leading suit, they are able to play any card that they want such as a trump card. If a non-trump card is played that is a different suit than the initial suit, it is lower ranking than any card following the initial suit or a trump card. The dealer then plays the third card following the same protocol. The winner of the previous trick leads the next trick. This repeats until all thirteen tricks are played.

Scoring

Non-Mizerka contracts 
Each player is assigned a quota. The dealer has a quota of one trick. Forehand has a quota of seven tricks. Middlehand has a quota of five tricks. In order to determine a player's score for a round, one determines his or her negative or positive difference in tricks from their quota. For example, if the dealer wins three tricks, he or she would determine that there is a difference of two tricks between his or her quota and the number of tricks won. Each player's score is then written in a scoring table (see below).

Mizerka contract 
The Mizerka is unique in that the quotas are changed. The dealer has a quota of seven. Forehand has a quota of one, and middlehand has a quota of five. Your score is then calculated by once again determining the difference between one's quota and his or her number of tricks one. A player receives a point for every trick won below his or her quota. A player also loses a point for every trick won above his or her quota. This is contrary to the traditional scoring method.

Example contract table 
Below is a sample scoring table for the game. This 4x8 chart includes the three players on the left column and the six possible contracts within the top row. Each player is assigned a box for each contract that they choose during their turn.

Example scoring table 
This scoring table shows a basic table which shows the scores for all 18 rounds played. The scores are totalled after each round and placed in the chart below.

Common slang 
Many games enjoy a rich history of terms and phrases that embody the cultural aspects that make them unique; Mizerka is no exception.  Although only a few people play it, the game has developed colloquial words, mostly based on actual terms, that add to the atmosphere of the game and have taken on a meaning of their own. One of these is "bizerka."  This word is a portmanteau of berserk and Mizerka. It can be used at any time during the game, to express frustration, disappointment, or astonishment. In some circles it can even be used as an expression of joy. Another popular word in most Mizerka circles is "taloon."  This word, a corruption of "talon", is used as an expression of moderate discontent with the cards one receives from the talon after exchanging cards. The next word is not as well known, and it believed to have started after someone found the word "taloon" to be quite comical, and decided to make a parody of it. "Controon" is used as an expression of disgust over another player’s choice of contract. It is mostly used when a player chooses a no trump or Mizerka round, in which initial and second card dealings are of much greater importance that rounds in which a suit is trump. This section cannot be cited since the cultural aspects of Mizerka are passed on by word of mouth.

References 

Whist group
Polish card games
Year of introduction missing